Jordon Nardino is a television writer. He has worked on several television series, including ABC's Desperate Housewives and NBC's Smash. He has also worked on Gilmore Girls, Threat Matrix, and, more recently, 10 Things I Hate About You.

He graduated from St. Mark's School (Massachusetts) in 1996 and Georgetown University in 2000.

References

External links
 

American soap opera writers
American male television writers
Georgetown University alumni
Living people
Place of birth missing (living people)
Year of birth missing (living people)